Dreaming My Dreams is  the twenty-second studio album by American country music artist Waylon Jennings. The album was co-produced with Jack Clement and recorded at Glaser Sound Studio in Nashville, Tennessee, between February and July 1974.

Following the 1972 renewal of his contract with RCA Records, Jennings gained artistic freedom, started to produce his own records, and changed his image to one inspired by the ongoing outlaw movement. Jennings recorded the critically acclaimed Honky Tonk Heroes and the commercial success This Time.

Jennings left the recording studios of RCA and moved his operation to the Glaser Sound Studio. After producer Clement married Jennings' sister-in-law and they became acquainted, Jennings was inspired to record an album upon hearing Allen Reynolds singing "Dreaming My Dreams with You" during a demo session hosted by Clement. Upon its release, the album received highly positive reviews from publications such as Rolling Stone, with critics praising the choice of songs and Jennings' vocals.

Dreaming My Dreams was released in June 1975; it topped the country albums chart and peaked at number forty-nine on the Billboard's Top LPs & Tapes. It was certified gold by the RIAA and Jennings won the Male Vocalist of the Year Country Music Association award. The singles "Are You Sure Hank Done It This Way" and "Dreaming My Dreams with You" peaked at numbers one and ten respectively on Billboard's Hot Country Songs.

Background
In 1972, Jennings' new manager Neil Reshen renegotiated the artist's contract with RCA Records. Under the new deal, Jennings received complete artistic control over his output.  To follow the start of the Outlaw movement, Jennings changed his image. He grew his beard and started to wear jeans, a hat, and leather vests during live performances. Jennings produced his next album, 1973's Lonesome, On'ry and Mean, himself. The same year he released the critically acclaimed album Honky Tonk Heroes, composed mainly of songs by then unknown songwriter Billy Joe Shaver.

Recording at RCA's Nashville studios with the label's personnel did not please Jennings. During the sessions for the album This Time, he moved his operation to Glaser Sound Studio. RCA initially refused to release the record, citing their agreement with the Engineers Union. The deal established that RCA artists could only record in the company's studio with label engineers. In a September 1973 interview with The Tennessean, Neil Reshen said RCA Records had violated Jennings' contract and talked about the possibility of signing the singer to another label. RCA Nashville director Jerry Bradley and New York-based label executive Mel Ilberman decided to allow Jennings to record at Glaser Sound, and broke RCA's deal with the Engineers Union. Citing Jennings as a precedent, RCA artists requested to be allowed to record in external facilities. Eventually, the label sold its Nashville studios. This Time topped Billboard's Top Country Albums chart.

Recording and composition
Dreaming My Dreams is the only Jennings album produced by "Cowboy" Jack Clement, an eccentric ex-Marine and former bluegrass sideman who was Sam Phillips right-hand man at Sun Records, producing Johnny Cash and Jerry Lee Lewis.  Jennings later declared, "He was a sheer-out genius, all soul.  If you got around him at the right moment, he could put the world back on track."  As Rich Kienzle observes in the liner notes to the 2001 reissue of the album, Clement and the renegade Jennings were kindred spirits when it came to their outlook on recording:

"In an era when most Nashville producers favored formulas over creativity, Clement viewed the studio as a painter viewed a blank canvas.  To him, even the most whimsical or uncommon ideas were worth trying.  Like Phillips, he favored an organic approach: recording singer and musicians together, live, in the studio and overdubbing only when necessary.  Anything else, he felt, robbed a performance of soul and spontaneity."

After Jack Clement married Waylon Jennings' sister-in-law,  Clement invited him to a Thursday night demo session in his personal studio. Clement's friend, Allen Reynolds, gave Jennings his recently written song "I Recall a Gypsy Woman", and later his co-composition with Bob McDill "Dreaming My Dreams With You".  The latter inspired Jennings to record an album.  The singer later remembered, "Jack liked to record musicians without earphones, trying to set up an environment that was live without sacrificing acoustics.  He wanted everybody to be in the room, to be able to hear and see and interact with each other...He would always try to get as much of it live as he could, though he was riveted on the rhythm section.  The main thing was to capture the drums and bass, and even if you got the bass just right, you could work from there."  Co-producing with Jack Clement, Jennings was backed by session musicians and his band members; drummer Richie Albright, bassist Duke Goff and steel-guitarist Ralph Mooney.  After tracking "I Recall A Gypsy Woman" and "Dreaming My Dreams with You" Jennings recorded the testosterone-driven "Waymore's Blues," a song he wrote with Curtis Buck and inspired by Jimmie Rodgers' songs. The sessions were halted because of  miscommunication with Jennings and problems caused by his drug use. While recording "Waymore's Blues", Clement tried to eject Jennings' wife and her sister from the control room. Confused by Clement's gestures, Jennings assumed that the producer was distracted by talking to the women instead of following the session. The singer left the studio for two weeks and was persuaded to return after having dinner with Clement and his wife.  When Jennings and Clement returned to redo "Waymore's Blues," they found that they could not reproduce the feel of the original track.  They decided to use the original on the album, and this explains the abrupt fade at the end of the song - to cover up Jennings storming out of the studio.

Although Jennings was at the forefront of "progressive" country music during this time, many of the songs on Dreaming My Dreams is rooted in the past, with Jennings celebrating his musical heroes and the cowboy tradition.  As music critic Stephen Thomas Erlewine in his review of the LP on AllMusic:

"This is an unabashedly romantic album, not just in its love songs, but in its tributes to Waylon's heroes. 'Are You Sure Hank Done It This Way' opens and 'Bob Wills Is Still the King' closes the album - making Jennings an heir apparent to their legacies. Between those two extremes, Waylon appropriates Jimmie Rodgers ('Waymore's Blues'), covers Roger Miller ('I've Been a Long Time Leaving'), ups the outlaw ante ('Let's All Help the Cowboys'), and writes and records as many sentimental tunes as possible without seeming like a sissy."

Songwriter Billy Ray Reynolds, who had befriended Ernest Tubb's bassist, told Jennings of an expression used by Tubb's band the Texas Troubadours. During breaks from the Midnight Jamboree, moving from Tubb's Record Shop to the air-conditioned bus, the musicians would ask if "Hank done it this way". While driving to the sessions for Dreaming My Dreams, inspired by the line and Hank Williams' influence, Jennings wrote on an envelope the lyrics to "Are You Sure Hank Done It This Way." He recorded the song upon his arrival to the studio.  In the book Outlaw: Waylon, Willie, Kris, and the Renegades of Nashville, Clement told author Michael Streissguth, "That was one of the key tracks.  We'd worked on it.  I played something on it, guitar or something.  Then he left, and I started mixing it.  And I mixed it in a whole different way.  I brought them guitars way up there, and he came in the next day or whenever we got back there and listened to it and loved it."  Jennings later said of the song:

With its relentless four-on-the-floor rhythm, phased guitars, and eerie drums, 'Hank' didn't sound like a standard country song.  There was no clear-cut verse and chorus, no fiddle middle break, no bridge, nothing but an endless back-and-forth seesaw between two chords.  Jack mixed the guitars together so they sounded like one huge instrument, matching their equalization settings so you couldn't tell where one blended into the other.  It felt like a different music, and Outlaw was as good a description as any.

Jennings also recorded the Hank Williams song "Let's Turn Back the Years."  In his autobiography Jennings recalls, "I felt chills all over me the first time I heard Hank Williams sing 'Lost Highway.'  I would stay up late on Saturday night listening for him, happy if I could just hear him speak.  I always wanted to be a singer, but he etched it in stone."  Clement provided backing vocals to his original composition "Let's All Help the Cowboys (Sing the Blues)" and Autry Inman's "She's Looking Good". The last addition to the LP, "Bob Wills Is Still The King" was recorded live in Austin, Texas, on September 27, 1974. The production of the record lasted six months, between February and July 1974.

"Are You Sure Hank Done It This Way"  backed with "Bob Wills Is Still The King", was released in August 1974, and topped the Hot Country Singles chart, while "Dreaming My Dreams with You," backed with "Waymore's Blues," peaked at number ten on that chart.  In his 1996 autobiography, Waylon, Jennings called Dreaming My Dreams his favorite among the albums he recorded. The liner notes, that stated that "the human voice is the only instrument that manages to give a glimpse of [Jennings'] soul", were written by Neil Diamond.  The 2001 reissue features the bonus tracks "All Around Cowboy" and Billy Joe Shaver's "Ride Me Down Easy" from the film Mackintosh and T.J. starring Roy Rogers.

Critical reception

Dreaming My Dreams was released in June 1975; it topped the Billboard's Top Country albums chart and peaked at number forty-nine on Billboard's Top LPs & Tapes chart.  It became Jennings' first album to be certified gold by the RIAA. He was elected Male Vocalist of the Year by the Country Music Association in 1975.Tony Glover of Rolling Stone described Jennings as "an ultimate performer". Comparing his studio recordings with his live performances, Glover said Jennings' work in the studio "seems to aim more for the midnight mind." Billboard praised Jennings' blend of Country music with other genres. The review said,"...the show belongs to Jennings' powerfully distinctive voice and the excellent production of the artist and Jack Clement." It called the recordings a "solid mix of ballad and rockers, some straight country and lots that cannot be classified," and said Jennings is "one of the few artists whose voice is immediately recognizable."  Stereo Review praised the album, called Jennings "one of the rare good singers capable of playing his own lead guitar," and called the instrumental breaks "witty and surprising." The American Home delivered a favorable review, saying the release "features fine interpretive material." Allmusic rated the album with five stars out of five, calling it "[Jennings'] best album since Honky Tonk Heroes, and one of the few of his prime outlaw period to deliver from beginning to end".  In the liner notes to the 2001 reissue of the LP, country music historian Rich Kienzle calls Jennings' singing on the title track, "a moving performance, brimming with passion and eloquence that in many ways summarized his musical essence."

Track listing

Original release

2001 reissue

Personnel

Waylon Jennings – vocals, lead guitar
Richie Albright – drums 
Duke Goff – bass guitar
Ralph Mooney – steel guitar

Overdubbed and session musicians

Johnny Gimble, Joe P. Allen, James Colvard, Billy Ray Raynolds, Randy Scruggs, Merle Watson, John Wilkin, Larry Whitmore – guitar
Kenny Malone – drums
Charles E. Cochran – piano
Buddy Spicher – fiddle
Charlie McCoy, Roger Crabtree – harmonica

Roy Christiansen, Martha McCrory – cello
Brenton Banks, Carl Gorodetzky, Martin Katahn, Sheldon Kurland, Stephanie Woolf –  violin
George Binkley III – violino
Marvin Chantry – viola

Charts

Weekly charts

Year-end charts

Singles

Footnotes

References

 

Waylon Jennings albums
1975 albums
Albums produced by Jack Clement
RCA Records albums
Buddah Records albums